Joseph Benedict Amangi Nacua (January 5, 1945 – September 10, 2022) was a Filipino Roman Catholic prelate. Nacua was born in the Philippines and was ordained to the priesthood in 1971. He served as the bishop of the Roman Catholic Diocese of Ilagan, Philippines from 2008 until his resignation in 2017.

Nacua is the first Filipino clergyman belonging to the Order of Friars Minor Capuchin to get ordained to the episcopate.

Nacua died on September 10, 2022 while confined in a hospital in Lipa, Batangas.

References

1945 births
2022 deaths
21st-century Roman Catholic bishops in the Philippines
Bishops appointed by Pope Benedict XVI
People from Benguet
Capuchin bishops